Events in the year 1964 in Germany.

Incumbents
President – Heinrich Lübke 
Chancellor – Ludwig Erhard

Events 

 1 January - Start of Einer wird gewinnen with Hans-Joachim Kulenkampff on German broadcaster ARD
 11 January - Germany in the Eurovision Song Contest 1964
 26 June - July 7 - 14th Berlin International Film Festival
 27 June-5 October: documenta III
 1 July - 1964 West German presidential election
 German company Auto Union is acquired by Volkswagen Group over subsidiary Audi AG.

Births 
2 January - Chris Welp, German professional basketball player (died 2015)
6 January- Henry Maske, boxer
28 January - Juergen Teller, German artist and photographer
4 February - Elke Philipp, German Paralympic equestrian
12 February - Stéphane Franke, German athlete (died 2011)
16 February - Susanne Baer, judge
27 February - Thomas Lange, rower
16 March - H.P. Baxxter, singer
30 March - Rüdiger Hoffmann, comedian
5 May - Heike Henkel, athlete 
21 May - Walter Homolka, rabbi
29 April - Markus Majowski, actor and comedian
2 June - Caroline Link, film director
17 June - Michael Gross, swimmer
20 June - Silke Möller, athlete
27 June - Kai Diekmann, journalist
17 July – Norbert Dobeleit, television personality and athlete
21 July - Jens Weißflog, ski jumper
23 July – Nick Menza, German-born American drummer (Megadeth) (d. 2016)
30 July - Jürgen Klinsmann, footballer
8 August - Jan Josef Liefers, actor
17 August - Natascha Ochsenknecht, German actress
19 August - Christoph Schrewe film director
24 August - Beatrice Gründler, German Arabist
12 September - Dirk Richter, German swimmer
24 September - Ralf Husmann, German television producer and screenwriter
2 October - Dirk Brinkmann, German field hockey player
10 October - Maxi Gnauck, gymnast
19 October - Georg F. W. Schaeffler, German entrepreneur
25 October - Nicole, singer
7 December - Ilse Aigner, politician
 8 December - Richard David Precht, author and philosopher
9 December 
 Hape Kerkeling, actor and comedian
 Johannes B. Kerner, journalist, sports caster and television presenter
 Paul Landers, musician, band Rammstein
 Michael Müller, politician
14 December – Antje Vowinckel, radio artist and musician
15 December – Denis Scheck, literary critic and journalist
16 December  - Heike Drechsler, athlete
19 December - Ben Becker, actor
24 December - Bernd Michael Lade, actor

Deaths
January 4 - Andreas Hermes, German politician (born 1878)
 January 18 - Thomas Wimmer, German politician (born 1887)
February 13 - Jakob Brendel, German wrestler (born 1907)
February 21 -Georg Jacoby, German film director and screenwriter (born 1882)
March 13 - Friedrich Lahrs, German architect (born 1880)
April 13 - Veit Harlan, German  film director and actor (born 1899)
April 20 - August Sander, German portrait and documentary photographer (born 1876)
April 24 - Gerhard Domagk German pathologist and bacteriologist (born 1895)
May 21 - James Franck, German physicist (born 1882)
June 5 - Ernst Waldow, German actor (born 1893)
September 10 - Paul Klingenburg, German water polo player (born 1907)
September 21 - Otto Grotewohl, German politician (born 1894)
September 28 - Richard Häussler, German actor (born 1908)
October 4 - Claus Bergen, German painter (born 1885)
October 26 - Agnes Miegel, German poet (born 1879)
November 1 — Karl von Graffen, Wehrmacht general (born 1893)
November 14 - Heinrich von Brentano, German politician (born 1904)
December 30 - Hans Gerhard Creutzfeldt, German neuropathologist (born 1885)

See also
 1964 in German television

References

 
Years of the 20th century in Germany
1960s in Germany
Germany
Germany